Brinsley Forde MBE (born 16 October 1953) is a British singer and actor of Guyanese parentage who is best known as the founder member of the reggae band Aswad and as a child actor in the children's television series Here Come the Double Deckers! (1970–71).

Forde appeared as Herman in two episodes of the sitcom Please Sir!. He appeared as Wesley in the feature film of the same name in 1971. Forde's feature film debut had come a year earlier when he played a substantial role in the John Boorman film Leo the Last (1970), which was filmed in West London in the streets soon to be demolished to make way for the Lancaster West Estate. He appeared in the James Bond film Diamonds Are Forever and the television programme The Georgian House. In 1980 he starred in Babylon (directed by Franco Rosso), as Blue, a disenfranchised youth who becomes a deejay on a South London reggae soundsystem.
 
Forde presented VH1 Soul Vibrations, BBC's Ebony & Ebony on the road, and was one of the radio presenters to open the BBC's first digital station 6 Music with his radio show Lively Up Yourself and Dub Bashment. Forde can be heard presenting the radio documentaries Behind The Smile: The Real Life of Bob Marley and Island Rock to mark the 40th anniversary of Jamaican independence.

A two-time Grammy Award nominee with Aswad, Forde scored a British number one chart hit with "Don't Turn Around" in 1988, followed by another top 20 chart hit, "Give A Little Love". The band continued to feature in the top 20 on the British charts with the album Distant Thunder, and the tracks "On and On", "Next to You" and "Shine".

In September 2009, Forde appeared with Dizzee Rascal performing "Can't Tek No More" from the latter's album Tongue n' Cheek on the BBC Two show Later... with Jools Holland. Forde followed this up with a repeat performance as part of the BBC Electric Proms in October 2009.

Forde was appointed Member of the Order of the British Empire (MBE) in the 2015 New Year Honours for services to the arts.

Filmography
Goodbye Charlie Bright (2001) - Floyd
Babylon (1980) – Blue
The Georgian House (TV series) (1976) – Ngo, Slaveboy
Please Sir! (1971) – Wesley
Diamonds Are Forever (1971) – Joshua, Houseboy (uncredited) 
Here Come the Double Deckers  (1970-71) - Spring 
Leo the Last (1970) – Bip

References

External links

 
Behind the Smile: The Real Life of Bob Marley at BBC's Radio 2.

1953 births
Living people
People from Islington (district)
20th-century Black British male singers
English people of Guyanese descent
English pop guitarists
English male guitarists
English Rastafarians
Singers from London
English reggae musicians
English male child actors
English male television actors
English male film actors
Members of the Order of the British Empire